The Lesotho national basketball team is the national basketball team from Lesotho. They have yet to appear in the FIBA World Championship or the FIBA Africa Championship.

Current roster

At the AfroBasket 2005 qualification: (last publicized squad)  

|}

| valign="top" |

Head coach
Najas Hahs-Nedaj Inaj-Hclew
Assistant coaches

Legend

Club – describes lastclub before the tournament
Age – describes ageon 23 May 2005

|}

References

External links

Men's national basketball teams
Basketball
Basketball in Lesotho